The 19th District of the Iowa House of Representatives in the state of Iowa.

Current elected officials
Carter Nordman is the representative currently representing the district.

Past representatives
The district has previously been represented by:
 Maynard T. Menefee, 1971–1973
 Joseph W. Clark, 1973–1975
 Thomas J. Jochum, 1975–1983
 Lowell Norland, 1983–1987
 Dennis J. May, 1987–1991
 Merlin Bartz, 1991–1993
 Gary Blodgett, 1993–2001
 Roger A. Broers, 2001–2003
 Ervin Dennis, 2003–2005
 Bob Kressig, 2005–2013
 Ralph Watts, 2013–2019
 Chris Hagenow, 2019–2021
 Carter Nordman, 2021–present

References

019